Mkhchyan is a village in the Artashat Municipality of the Ararat Province of Armenia near the Armenia–Turkey border. The town is named after Liparit Mkchyan, a Soviet commander killed in 1921.

References

External links
 
 World Gazeteer: Armenia – World-Gazetteer.com
 

Populated places in Ararat Province
Yazidi populated places in Armenia